Silje Karine Muotka (born 12 April 1975) is a Norwegian-Sámi politician from Nesseby who lives in Alta, Norway. Muotka is the president of the Sámi Parliament of Norway and was formerly a member of the Sámi Parliament's executive council.

Education
Muotka has been involved in Sámi politics and activism since her youth, and she has worked with Sámi organizations since the 1990s. She studied law and culture at the University of Tromsø - The Arctic University of Norway, and administration and leadership at the Bodø Graduate School of Business. She works at the University of Tromsø.

Political career

Sámi Parliament
From 1993 to 1997 she served as a substitute member in the Sámi Parliament, and in 1996 she was named to a working group on Sámi youth. From 1997 to 2000 she served as a substitute for the leader of the Sámi cultural council. From 2006 to 2008 she served as president of the Norwegian Sámi Association (NSR). In 2009 she was elected as a regular member of the Sámi Parliament, representing the Nordre electoral district for the NSR. She chaired the Child Development, Care, and Education Committee and sat on the Control Committee. In 2013, she was re-elected and joined the executive council, with Inger Elin Utsi taking her place as substitute member of parliament. She served in the executive council until 2016, after which she resumed her duties as member of parliament.

President of the Norwegian Sámi Parliament
Following the 2021 election, she became president of the Sámi Parliament.

After a year in office, she criticised the government's proposal for the 2023 state budget, which included a 4% increase for the Sámi Parliament, which in reality were cuts in means for it. The Sámi Parliament's budget chief, Runar Myrnes Balto, went further and called the cuts "discriminating".

References 

1975 births
Norwegian Sámi politicians
Norwegian Sámi people
Members of the Sámi Parliament of Norway
People from Nesseby
Living people